The Ford Falcon (XY) is a full-size car produced by Ford Australia from 1970 to 1972. It was the fourth and last iteration of the second generation of the Falcon and included the Ford Fairmont (XY)—the luxury-oriented version.

Overview
The XY Falcon was released in October 1970 replacing the XW Falcon. The XY was a facelift of the XW, featuring a new divided grille and redesigned tail lights. Improvements were made to seating, safety equipment and ride quality.

Model range
The XY Falcon range featured eight passenger vehicles and three commercial models.

 Ford Falcon Sedan
 Ford Falcon Wagon
 Ford Falcon 500 Sedan
 Ford Falcon 500 Wagon
 Ford Futura Sedan
 Ford Fairmont Sedan
 Ford Fairmont Wagon
 Ford Falcon GT Sedan
 Ford Falcon Utility
 Ford Falcon Van
 Ford Falcon 500 Utility
 Ford Falcon Limousine 
 Ford Falcon Panel Van

Futura and Fairmont models, whilst marketed as part of the XY Falcon range, were not officially referred to or badged as Falcons.

A GS Rally Pack was available as an option on the Falcon 500, Futura and Fairmont Sedans and Wagons.

Falcon GTHO Phase III
A high-performance Falcon GTHO Phase III was released in May 1971.

Falcon 4-wheel-drive utility

A four-wheel-drive version of the Utility was produced in 1972. It was marketed simply as the Falcon 4-wheel-drive utility  and 432 examples were built.

Engines
New  and  inline six-cylinder engines replaced the smaller-capacity sixes offered in the XW. The  and  V8s were carried over from the previous range, though the larger capacity small block was dropped and only the Cleveland engine was available. A  version of the Cleveland  engine, with a two-barrelled 2V (venturi) carburetor was the top option on the XY Falcon and ZD Fairmont range. The , four-barrelled, 4V version of the engine was only offered on the XY GT and GTHO.

Production
Production of the XY Falcon range totalled 118,666 vehicles. 1,557  XY Falcon GTs and 300 XY GT-HOs were built.

Replacement
The XY range was replaced by the XA Falcon in March 1972.

External links

References

XY
Cars of Australia
Cars introduced in 1970
XY Falcon
Sedans
Station wagons
Coupé utilities
Vans
Rear-wheel-drive vehicles
1970s cars
Cars discontinued in 1972